Jacob Parker (born July 9, 1993) is an American basketball player. He competed collegiately for the Stephen F. Austin Lumberjacks. Parker was named Southland Conference Player of the Year in 2014.

On July 29, 2015, Parker signed a contract with Slovenian champions KK Šentjur of the Telemach League and the ABA League.

References

External links
FIBA profile

1993 births
Living people
American expatriate basketball people in Germany
American expatriate basketball people in Slovenia
American men's basketball players
Basketball players from Oklahoma
NINERS Chemnitz players
KK Šentjur players
People from Bixby, Oklahoma
Power forwards (basketball)
Rockets (basketball club) players
Stephen F. Austin Lumberjacks basketball players